Kodamanchili is a village in West Godavari district in the state of Andhra Pradesh in India. The nearest railway station is Palakollu (PKO) located a distance of 15.45 Km.

Demographics
 India census, Kodamanchili has a population of 6151 of which 3139 are males while 3012 are females. The average sex ratio of Kodamanchili village is 960. The child population is 609, which makes up 9.90% of the total population of the village, with sex ratio 1057. In 2011, the literacy rate of Kodamanchili village was 77.86% when compared to 67.02% of Andhra Pradesh.

Archaeology
23rd Tirthankara Sri Nageswara Parsvanath statue was found in this village. Jain Mandir was constructed with the idol of 23rd Tirthankara Sri Nageswara Parsvanath.

See also 
 West Godavari district

References 

Villages in West Godavari district